Parshuram Ballal Godbole (1799 – 3 September 1874) was a Marathi lexicographer, editor, and translator.

He was one of the editors of Panditi Kosha, a dictionary prepared by Sanskrit scholars.
He was also the editor of Navneet, a collection of Marathi poems.

He was the Personal Pandit for Thomas Candy.

References 

1799 births
1874 deaths
Marathi people